"Better Use Your Head" is a song and single by American R&B group, Little Anthony & The Imperials written by Teddy Randazzo, who also produced it, and his wife Victoria Pike.

Credits: The Imperials
 "Little Anthony" Gourdine (lead)
  Clarence "Wah-Hoo" Collins (baritone/bass)
  Ernest Wright (2nd tenor)
  Sammy Strain (1st tenor)

Other credits
Producer: Teddy Randazzo
Orchestra: Don Costa

Chart performance
"Better Use Your Head", was originally released in the US on the Veep label in 1966 with "The Wonder of It All" as the B-side, it reached # 54 on the Billboard Hot 100.
It was later re-released in 1976 following its gain in popularity after having been played in clubs on the Northern soul scene in the UK. It made number 42 in the UK charts in July 1976 and was Little Anthony & The Imperials only UK chart success.

References

External links
 The Imperials (Little Anthony, Sammy , Ernest, & Clarence)- "Better Use Your Head" (YouTube Video - 1966)

1966 songs
1966 singles
1976 singles
Little Anthony and the Imperials songs
Songs written by Teddy Randazzo
Northern soul songs